Ajdin Hasić (born 7 October 2001) is a Bosnian professional footballer who plays as a winger for Göztepe on loan from Beşiktaş, and the Bosnia and Herzegovina U21 national team.

Hasić started his professional career at Beşiktaş, who loaned him to Ümraniyespor in 2020 and in 2022.

Club career

Beşiktaş
Hasić started playing football at his hometown club Budućnost Banovići, before joining youth academy of Croatian team Dinamo Zagreb in 2014. In January 2020, he signed a four-year deal with Turkish side Beşiktaş. In February, he was sent on a six-month loan to Ümraniyespor. He made his professional debut against Boluspor on 15 February at the age of 18. On 21 June, he scored his first professional goal against Fatih Karagümrük.

Hasić made his official debut for Beşiktaş on 13 September against Trabzonspor. On 3 January 2021, he scored his first goal for the team in a triumph over Kayserispor.

In March, he suffered a severe knee injury, which was diagnosed as anterior cruciate ligament tear and was ruled out for at least six months. He won his first trophy with the club on 31 May, when they were crowned league champions.

In January 2022, he was loaned back to Ümraniyespor until the end of season.

International career
Hasić represented Bosnia and Herzegovina at all youth levels. He also served as captain of under-17 and under-19 teams.

In October 2020, he received his first senior call-up, for a friendly game against Iran and 2020–21 UEFA Nations League games against Netherlands and Italy.

Career statistics

Club

Honours
Beşiktaş
Süper Lig: 2020–21
Turkish Cup: 2020–21

References

External links

2001 births
Living people
People from Banovići
Bosniaks of Bosnia and Herzegovina
Bosnia and Herzegovina Muslims
Bosnia and Herzegovina footballers
Bosnia and Herzegovina youth international footballers
Bosnia and Herzegovina under-21 international footballers
Bosnia and Herzegovina expatriate footballers
Association football wingers
Beşiktaş J.K. footballers
Ümraniyespor footballers
Göztepe S.K. footballers
TFF First League players
Süper Lig players
Expatriate footballers in Turkey
Bosnia and Herzegovina expatriate sportspeople in Turkey